Double-stranded RNA-binding protein Staufen homolog 1 is a protein that in humans is encoded by the STAU1 gene.

Staufen is a member of the family of double-stranded RNA (dsRNA)-binding proteins involved in the transport and/or localization of mRNAs to different subcellular compartments and/or organelles. These proteins are characterized by the presence of multiple dsRNA-binding domains which are required to bind RNAs having double-stranded secondary structures. The human homologue of staufen encoded by STAU, in addition contains a microtubule-binding domain similar to that of microtubule-associated protein 1B, and binds tubulin. The STAU gene product has been shown to be present in the cytoplasm in association with the rough endoplasmic reticulum (RER), implicating this protein in the transport of mRNA via the microtubule network to the RER, the site of translation. Five transcript variants resulting from alternative splicing of STAU gene and encoding three isoforms have been described. Three of these variants encode the same isoform, however, differ in their 5'UTR.

STAU1 is associated with stress granules.

Structure
Two orthologues of Staufen, Staufen1 (STAU1) and Staufen2 (STAU2) have distinct cellular functions. STAU1 is expressed in many cell types and tissues and STAU2 is expressed in the brain and heart.  The expression of STAU1 has been associated with the disruption of cellular functions and the pathophysiology of neurodegenerative and neuromuscular disorders and cancer. Mature STAU1 mRNAs produce five alternative splice variants that are different in their 5’UTR regions. The main STAU1 variants have double-stranded RNA-binding domains (dsRBD), a microtubule-binding domain (TBD), and a STAU1-swapping motif (SSM).  STAU1-binding sites (SBS) are located in 3’UTR, 5’UTR, and coding regions of over 1000 transcripts.

Regulation

RNA metabolism
STAU1 plays a significant role in RNA metabolism and affects crucial cellular functions. STAU1 recognizes and associates with cis-acting motifs or localization signals in 3’UTR of target mRNAs.  Then, motor proteins dynein and kinesin are recruited and actively transport mRNAs to subcellular locations using cytoskeletal networks.  This suggests that STAU1 plays a role in linking motor molecules and mRNA cargos.
STAU1 also plays a role in mRNA translation.  STAU1 localization with the rough endoplasmic reticulum (RER) emphasizes its role in transporting mRNA to the site of translation.  
STAU1 is associated with the regulation of mRNA stability by directly binding RBPs to the regulatory motifs of target mRNAs that promotes mRNA stability and enhances mRNA translation. In mouse myoblasts (C2C12 cells), for example, STAU1 directly binds to the 3’UTR of Dv12 mRNA, which enhances its stability and promotes cell proliferation. 
STAU1 plays a role in mRNA decay as well. STAU1-mediated mRNA decay (SMD) is an mRNA degradation process that involves direct binding of STAU1 to SBS, which is located downstream of the stop codon of the target mRNA.  Once STAU1 is bound to the target mRNA, an interaction occurs between STAU1 and RNA helicase UPF1, which enhances its helicase activity and promotes SMD.  It has been shown that STAU1 binding to UPF2 is a more stable interaction than with UPF1, which indicates that the STAU1/UPF2 complex is responsible for recruiting UPF1 to the site of SMD.  Furthermore, the STAU1 binding site (SBS) within the human ADP-ribosylation factor1 (ARF1) 3'UTR binds STAU1 and downregulates ARF1 cytoplasmic mRNA levels by SMD.

Cell growth
STAU1 regulates mRNA translation of key components in the cell cycle, which indicates its role in cell growth.  Recently, STAU1-mediated post-transcriptional regulation of cell cycle mRNAs showed a proliferation of non-transformed cells as the expression level of 30 cell cycle regulator transcripts was dysregulated in STAU-1 depleted cells.  
STAU1 was also shown to bind to the 3’UTR of E2F1 mRNA, which played a part in its translation and promotes G1/S transition.  Thus, STAU1 expression is associated with proper splicing and expression of neural genes.
STAU1 levels in proliferating human transformed cell lines HCT116 and U2OS at various phases of the cell cycle revealed that STAU1 protein levels increase during S and G2 phases and rapidly drops in mitosis.  STAU1 mRNA levels remain unchanged but STAU1 proteins were degraded by the anaphase-promoting complex (APC) ubiquitin-proteasome system as cells enter mitosis.  
When STAU1 protein interacts with APC/C adapter proteins Cdc20 and Cdh1, proteasomal degradation is promoted in mitotic cells.  These examples indicate that ectopic expression of STAU1 diminishes proliferation and reveals that regulation of STAU1 levels is necessary for the prevention of detrimental impacts of STAU1 on mitosis.

Role in cancer

Cell polarity
A variety of cell polarity proteins are classified as tumor suppressors or proto-oncogenes as a disruption of cell polarity has been linked to cancer.   STAU1 has been shown to be asymmetrically distributed in the apical pole in differentiated intestinal epithelial cells, which reveals the significance of STAU1-induced cell polarity in normal tissue development and emphasizes the detrimental impact of STAU1 dysregulation on cells and organs.  STAU1 dysregulation may play a role in cancer cell development and progression. STAU1 has been associated with maintaining a balance between pluripotency and differentiation properties of stem-like cancer cells.  To this extent, STAU1 can exhibit tumor suppressor or oncogenic effects depending on the source and type of cancer stem cells. For example, the expression of STAU1 on the differentiation of mouse myoblasts has shown a negative impact, indicating that STAU1 may inhibit myogenesis in cancer stem cells and promote muscle-related cancers.

STAU1-mediated mRNA decay
STAU1-mediated mRNA decay also plays a role in the control of cancer cell proliferation.  SMD of transcriptional factor retina and anterior neural fold homobox2 (RAX2) transcript has shown to be required for the inhibition of tumor growth and metastasis.  Furthermore, STAU1 interaction with a ribonucleoprotein complex with RAX2 transcripts, brain-derived neurotrophic factor antisense (BDNF-AS) IncRNA, and RNA helicase UPF1 triggers SMD of RAX2 mRNAs and inhibits glioblastoma progression.  Another study has shown that increased STAU1-mediated degradation of zinc-finger protein 331 mRNAs is linked to the growth of glioma cells and correlates directly with tumor grades.  So, STAU1 may play differential roles in in vitro models in comparison to tumor tissues of brain cancer based on the disease stage and its direct mRNA targets.  Proper regulation of SMD may exert anti-tumor effects in high-grade gliomas.

Cellular differentiation
Tight regulation of SMD in gastric cancer cell lines may improve its treatment and prognosis. For example, upregulated TINCR lncRNA in gastric cell lines (SGC7901 and BGC823) forms a ribonucleoprotein complex with STAU1, UPF1, and KLF2 mRNA, which promotes SMD and KLF2 transcripts.  Knockdown of STAU1 or overexpression of KLF2 in SGC7901 and BGC823 increased expression levels of cyclin-dependent kinases (CDKs) and reduced cell proliferation. 
STAU1 regulates cancer cell survival through translational regulation.  For example, in embryonal rhabdomyosarcoma cells (RD), increased expression of STAU1 is associated with an increase in cell proliferation, which suggests that genetic silencing of STAU1 in vitro reduces the growth of cancer cells and inhibits tumor formation in vivo.  Downregulation of STAU1 in prostate cancer cell line LNCaP inhibits proliferation of these cells without inducing apoptosis.
STAU1 regulates the stability and translation of myogenic mRNAs, which negatively affects myoblast differentiation.  For example, STAU1 depletion in C2C12 myoblasts has been shown to increase the expression of myoglobin and myogenin and promotes spontaneous activation of myogenesis. 
In differentiated human neuroblastoma cell line SH-SY5Y, localization of ribonucleoprotein complexes containing STAU1 in some dendrites is necessary for dendrite formation and morphology.  Furthermore, it was revealed that elevated expression of STAU1 during differentiation of SH-SY5Y cells is required for proper development of dendrites and siRNA-mediated silencing of STAU1 in SH-SY5Y cells partially blocks cell differentiation and changes dendrite organization, density, and length.  Consequently, regulating STAU1-mediated alternative splicing is crucial for normal neural growth, proliferation, and axon development.

Cell migration
STAU1 has also been shown to be essential for the proper migration of primordial germ cells (PGCs) during gametogenesis in zebrafish.  In STAU1-compromised embryos, PGCs failed to survive. STAU1 also plays a role in the positive and negative regulation of cancer cell migration through multiple mechanisms.  Consequently, STAU1 has been put forward as a potential therapeutic target for the inhibition of cancer metastasis. STAU1 negatively controls the migration of Hela cells through the promotion of mRNA degradation of SERPINE1 and RAB11-family-interacting protein 1 (RAB11FIP1) through SMD.  STAU1 blocks cell migration and invasion through the degradation of metal regulatory transcription factor 1 (MTF1) and YY2 transcription factor (YY2) through SMD in glioma cell lines. In contrast, in RD cell lines, elevated STAU1 promotes cell migration and invasion and genetic silencing of STAU1 reduces cell metastasis and inhibits cancer progression.  In prostate cell lines, elevated STAU1 led to increased migration and invasion through FAK signaling, indicating that STAU1 downregulation inhibits the motility and metastasis of prostate cancer cells.  Elevated levels of STAU1 in neural cells have been shown to promote apoptosis by activating the PERK-CHOP pathway and lead to neurodegeneration.  Furthermore, in colorectal cell lines HCT116, LS174T, and HT-29, SMD inhibition by lncRNA SNHG5 promotes cancer cell survival via the increase in stability of several SMD target mRNAs.

References

Further reading